Austrodrillia angasi, common name Angas's turrid, is a species of sea snail, a marine gastropod mollusk in the family Horaiclavidae.

It was previously classified within the family Turridae.

Description
The length of the shell attains 16 mm.

The shell has a brownish olivaceous color. It contains 9 whorls. The embryonal whorls are smooth. The others contain from seven to ten short longitudinal ribs forming a tuberculated shoulder. The surface often shows minute revolving striae. The aperture is chestnut-brown. Sometimes there is a brown band below the middle of the body whorl.

Distribution
This marine species is endemic to Australia and occurs off New South Wales, Tasmania and Victoria.

References

 Crosse, H. 1863. Description d'espèces nouvelles d'Australie. Journal de Conchyliologie 11: 84–90 
 Angas, G.F. 1867. A list of species of marine Mollusca found in Port Jackson harbour, New South Wales, and on the adjacent coasts, with notes on their habits, etc. Part I. Proceedings of the Zoological Society of London 1867: 185–233 
 Hedley, C. 1922. A revision of the Australian Turridae. Records of the Australian Museum 13(6): 213–359, pls 42–56
 Allan, J.K. 1950. Australian Shells: with related animals living in the sea, in freshwater and on the land. Melbourne : Georgian House xix, 470 pp., 45 pls, 112 text figs. 
 Laseron, C. 1954. Revision of the New South Wales Turridae (Mollusca). Australian Zoological Handbook. Sydney : Royal Zoological Society of New South Wales 1–56, pls 1–12.
 Wells, F.E. 1990. Revision of the recent Australian Turridae referred to the genera Splendrillia and Austrodrillia. Journal of the Malacological Society of Australasia 11: 73–117
 Wilson, B. 1994. Australian Marine Shells. Prosobranch Gastropods. Kallaroo, WA : Odyssey Publishing Vol. 2 370 pp.

External links
 
 MNHN, Paris: syntype

angasi
Gastropods of Australia